Coba Coba Remixed is the first remix album of Novalima's original album, Coba Coba, both under the U.S. independent record label, Cumbancha. It was released on June 16, 2009, and features electronic-influenced remixes of songs from Coba Coba.

Reception
The album was generally well received, with Johnathan Rothman (of Exclaim!) praising its "musical blend of Afro-Peruvian call-and-response traditions with dub, house, salsa, breaks and whatever else they like." Based on customer reviews, the album holds a rating of 4 out of 5 stars on Amazon

Track listing

References

Further reading
 Cumbancha
 Exclaim
 WRUV

Novalima albums
2009 remix albums